Peter Erling Jacobsen (born March 4, 1954) is an American professional golfer and commentator on Golf Channel and NBC. He has played on the PGA Tour and the Champions Tour. He has won seven events on the PGA Tour and two events on the Champions Tour, both majors.

Early years
Jacobsen was born and raised in Portland, Oregon. He graduated from Portland’s Lincoln High School.

Jacobsen played college golf at the University of Oregon. He turned professional in 1976 after winning the Oregon Open as an amateur. He is one of golf's most colorful personalities, which makes him one of the more popular players with fans.

Professional career

PGA Tour
Jacobsen qualified for the PGA Tour in his first attempt, finishing in 19th place at the 1976 qualifying tournament. He made steady progress during his first few seasons on the tour, before capturing his first title in 1980 at the Buick-Goodwrench Open. He won twice on the tour in 1984 and broke into the top-10 on the money list for the first time. Two more wins in 1995 catapulted him to a career best 7th place on the end of season money list. As a result of his performance during those two seasons, he was selected to play in two Ryder Cups, in 1985 and 1995.

Jacobsen has won seven tournaments on the PGA Tour, the last coming at the 2003 Greater Hartford Open at the age of 49, making him one of the oldest players to win on the PGA Tour. That year he was voted the Tour's comeback player of the year.

Champions Tour
Since turning fifty, Jacobsen has competed mainly on the Champions Tour, although he continued to play on the PGA Tour for several years. In his first year of eligibility for senior golf, he won the 2004 U.S. Senior Open, one of senior golf's major championships. The following year he added a second senior major title at the 2005 Senior Players Championship.

Other projects
Away from competing, Jacobsen has presented two shows on the Golf Channel. Plugged In was a variety show, featuring music, story-telling and skits performed with co-host Matt Griesser, former star of the FootJoy SignBoy campaign, and Peter and Friends was a panel discussion show.

Jacobsen appeared as himself alongside Kevin Costner in the 1996 movie Tin Cup, where he was the winner of the fictional U.S. Open.

A self-taught guitarist, Jacobsen was a founding member and lead singer of Jake Trout & The Flounders, a band he formed in the mid-80s with Mark Lye and Payne Stewart. The group is no longer together, but they recorded two albums.

Jacobsen owns Peter Jacobsen Sports, an event management company that has run several professional golf tournaments including the JELD-WEN Tradition, one of the majors on the Champions Tour, and the CVS Caremark Charity Classic, one of the PGA Tour's Challenge Series events. Until 2002 it also organized the Fred Meyer Challenge, a three-day charity event in Oregon.

Jacobsen is known for his laid-back, humorous personality. During the Fred Meyer Challenge, he was known to do impressions of other players, such as Craig Stadler. The event was filmed and broadcast on the Golf Channel, and they have released a DVD and VHS of the footage, titled "Peter's Party." His sharp but playful humor is also evident in the video and audio commentary he provides for the player's shot, good or bad, in various versions of Golden Tee Golf, a video game from Incredible Technologies, including Peter Jacobson's Golden Tee 3D Golf.

Jacobsen is also the face of Peter Jacobsen Challenge Keno and Peter Jacobsen Challenge Poker, two video gambling casino games.

Personal life
Jacobsen married in December 1976 to Jan. The couple have three children: Amy, Kristen, and Mick.

Amateur wins (1)
1974 Pacific-8 Conference Championship

Professional wins (18)

PGA Tour wins (7)

PGA Tour playoff record (1–3)

PGA Tour of Australasia wins (1)

Other wins (7)
1976 Oregon Open (as an amateur), Northern California Open
1979 Oregon Open
1981 Johnnie Walker Trophy
1982 Johnnie Walker Trophy
1986 Fred Meyer Challenge (with Curtis Strange; Shared title with Greg Norman & Gary Player)
1989 Isuzu Kapalua International

Champions Tour wins (2)

Other senior wins (1)
2008 Wendy's Champions Skins Game (with Fuzzy Zoeller)

Results in major championships

CUT = missed the half-way cut
WD = Withdrew
"T" = tied

Summary

Most consecutive cuts made – 15 (1980 U.S. Open – 1984 PGA)
Longest streak of top-10 finishes – 1 (six times)

Results in The Players Championship

CUT = missed the halfway cut
"T" indicates a tie for a place

Results in World Golf Championships

"T" = Tied

Senior major championships

Wins (2)

Results timeline
Results not in chronological order before 2017.

CUT = missed the halfway cut
WD = withdrew
"T" indicates a tie for a place

Awards
2003 PGA Tour Comeback Player of the Year
2003 Oregon Sports Hall of Fame
2006 Francis Ouimet Award
2012 Old Tom Morris Award
2013 Payne Stewart Award
2017 Northern Ohio Golf Charities Ambassador of Golf Award

U.S. national team appearances
Professional
Japan vs USA Match: 1984 
Ryder Cup: 1985, 1995
Dunhill Cup: 1995
Wendy's 3-Tour Challenge (representing PGA Tour): 1995, 2003 (winners), 2004 (Champions Tour)

See also 

 Fall 1976 PGA Tour Qualifying School graduates

References

External links

Peter Jacobsen gives it a try at U.S. Senior Open - The Oregonian

American male golfers
Oregon Ducks men's golfers
PGA Tour golfers
PGA Tour Champions golfers
Ryder Cup competitors for the United States
Winners of senior major golf championships
Golf writers and broadcasters
Golfers from Portland, Oregon
Lincoln High School (Portland, Oregon) alumni
People from Bonita Springs, Florida
1954 births
Living people